Five subsidiary structures located near the Palace of Versailles have a historical relation with the history and evolution of the palace. Of these five structures – the Ménagerie, the Pavillon de la Lanterne, the Trianon de Porcelaine, the Grand Trianon (also called the Marble Trianon), and the Petit Trianon – two have been destroyed (the Ménagerie and the Trianon de Porcelaine); however, historical documentation and accounts permit these two structures to be discussed. As an ensemble of buildings related to, yet removed from, the chateau of Versailles, they represent architectural masterworks of the 17th and 18th centuries that have inspired architects to this day.

Ménagerie

In response to increased interest in zoology—and especially with regard to Aristotelian theology, which experienced a renaissance through the works of Claude Perrault; as well as the passion for the exotic, Louis XIV ordered the construction of the Ménagerie in 1662. Completed in 1664, the Ménagerie was located at the southern end of the transverse branch of the Grand Canal. Comprising a complex of building that featured a central octagonal two-story pavilion, the Ménagerie was a favorite destination for visitors and courtiers.

In Diderot's Encyclopédie, Louis-Jean-Marie Daubenton recounts a story in which Louis XIV took delivery of an African elephant as a gift from King Afonso VI of Portugal.  

The ground floor of the central pavilion contained a salon frais, which was decorated with shell work to resemble a grotto. On the second floor were a series of rooms, each with a balcony that overlooked the animal enclosures that surrounded the pavilion.

In 1697, the 12-year-old Marie Adélaïde of Savoy married Louis XIV's grandson, Louis, Duke of Burgundy. The duchesse's vivacity and precociousness quickly won the heart of the aging king, who presented the Ménagerie to the duchesse. Between 1698 and 1700, the interior was redecorated. In a stylistic departure from the aesthetic of Louis XIV's fourth building campaign in the chateau, which was characterized by courtly austerity, the new décor of the Ménagerie was characterized by a youthful exuberance that anticipated the Rococo style of Louis XV.

Regrettably, in 1801, the Ménagerie, which had been sold during the sales of land that occurred after the Revolution, was destroyed. Today, the Pavilion de la Lanterne, the only surviving vestige of the Ménagerie, is being restored providing us with a glimpse of the cynegetic decoration of this lost Versailles masterpiece.

Trianon de Porcelaine

Located at the northern end of the transverse arm of the Grand Canal, the Trianon de Porcelaine formed a pendant to the Ménagerie. Designed by Louis Le Vau and François d'Orbay and built between 1669 and 1670 as a pleasure pavilion for Louis XIV and his mistress, the marquise de Montespan, the central pavilion and its four smaller buildings were covered with blue and white earthenware (rather than porcelain, which had not yet been made in Europe) tiles in imitation of porcelain tiles. Regrettably, the Trianon de Porcelaine was relatively short-lived, owing to the waning of the marquise de Montespan's popularity and the maintenance of the exterior tile revetment—tiles would fracture and detach from the surface of the buildings due to the cold weather. In 1687, the Trianon de Porcelaine was destroyed; but, as the location of favored by Louis XIV, the Grand Trianon was built on the same site.

Grand Trianon

It has been said that Louis XIV built Versailles for his court, Trianon for his family, and Marly for his friends—and the Grand Trianon did serve the Sun King and his family. Built by Jules Hardouin-Mansart, the Grand Trianon is unabashedly one of his greatest works. Constructed of pink Languedoc marble between 1687 and 1689 in an Italianate-style, this two-story structure succeeds—architecturally and stylistically—where the chateau of Versailles fails.

Jules Hardouin-Mansart designed the structure in two distinct sections. An entry courtyard separated the two principal wings of the building. To the left (south), this wing originally housed the service area as well as the private apartments of Louis XIV. The right (north) wing contained two enfilades—one opening to the upper garden to the west, the other opening to the wall-enclosed jardin du roi (King's garden) to the east. The area opening to the north of the entry courtyard originally contained a small theater. The two wings communicate by an open colonnade, which also serves as a transitional element linking the courtyard with the gardens beyond.

Situated perpendicular to the north wing is the Galerie. With a length of nearly 30 meters and lit by five windows on the north and 11 windows on the south, the Galerie is the largest room of the Grand Trianon and its placement serves as a northern protective barrier for the upper garden.

Constructed west of the Galerie and running perpendicularly to the north is the wing known as Trianon-sous-bois. It was in this part of the house that Louis XIV provided apartments for members of his family. In the area east of Trianon-sous-bois and north of the Galerie was a marshy area that Jules Hardouin-Mansart converted into the jardin des sources. Reminiscent of the bosquet des sources in the garden of Versailles, this area featured rivulets and islets set in a wooded setting.
	
As with the chateau of Versailles, the Grand Trianon underwent many changes and modifications during the reign of Louis XIV, especially the relocation of his apartment from the south wing to the north wing. However, significantly different from Versailles, was the decor of the Grand Trianon. Where Versailles' decor extolled the heroic actions of Louis XIV in the guise of Augustus, Alexander, and Apollo, this didactic component is not evident in the décor of the Grand Trianon. The style of the Grand Trianon reflected a more relaxed atmosphere and life-style that was removed from the constraints of protocol and etiquette found at Versailles.

During the reign of Louis XV, the Grand Trianon underwent minor modifications: the theater was removed and a suite of rooms opening onto the jardin du roi was redecorated for the Marquise de Pompadour. Louis XVI effectively ignored the Grand Trianon; and, during the Revolution, the furniture—as at Versailles—was sold. However, unlike Versailles, the Grand Trianon did not have an uncertain future.

Napoléon I was enamored of the Grand Trianon and ordered the building remodeled and redecorated for his and his family's use. During the reign of Louis-Philippe, the Grand Trianon was an especial favorite residence of the king and royal family. Much of the redecoration ordered under Napoléon I and Louis-Philippe is found today at the Grand Trianon.

Republican France has retained—and restored to a prominent position—the Grand Trianon. During the administration of Charles de Gaulle, the Grand Trianon was completely renovated and modernized—largely to accommodate his lavish banquets. Accordingly, Trianon-sous-bois was remodeled to provide modern living accommodations and the basement was completely renovated to accommodate modern professional kitchens.

The Grand Trianon has been designated an official residence of the French president and often serves as a residence for visiting heads of state. It was during the presidency of Jacques Chirac that Trianon-sous-bois was opened to limited public tours.

Petit Trianon

 Located near the Grand Trianon, the Petit Trianon was built between 1762 and 1768 by Jacques-Anges Gabriel for Louis XV. The area that is now the Petit Trianon came to prominence when Louis XV established his jardins botaniques (botanical gardens) in the area that is now the Hameau de la Reine. The Petit Trianon was intended to be used when the king was engaged in his botanical avocation. It would be, however, under Louis XVI and Marie Antoinette that the Petit Trianon would be immortalized.

Shortly after his ascension to the throne, Louis XVI presented the Petit Trianon to Marie Antoinette. Immediately thereafter, the queen ordered modification—largely under the direction of Richard Mique—to the Petit Trianon and its gardens. The house was remodeled, which necessitated the removal of the dumbwaiter system that Louis XV installed that allowed the dining table to be lowered to the kitchen level of the house, thus eliminating the need for servants in the dining room. At this time, the jardins botaniques were removed to Paris and the Hameau de la reine constructed in their stead.

Regarded by opponents as a folly of Marie Antoinette, the Hameau was a model bucolic village and farm in which advances in agronomy and animal husbandry were practiced. Owing to the association with Marie Antoinette's perceived excesses—such as the construction of a theater where she and her friends acted to private audiences—the Petit Trianon and the Hameau were pillaged during the Revolution. Napoléon I presented the Petit Trianon to his mother, Letizia Buonaparte – a purely symbolic gesture as she never lived there. Louis-Philippe, in his turn, presented it to his wife, Marie Amélie, who refurbished the gardens and reappointed the house. In more recent times, the Petit Trianon and the Hameau de la reine have been undergoing an aggressive restoration program that is seeking to return them to their state when Marie-Antoinette left them in October 1789.

Pavillon de la Lanterne

The Lanterne is the name given to a hunting lodge located at Versailles near the Ménagerie. As a vacation retreat for prime ministers during the fifth Republic—effectively forming a pendant to the Grand Trianon, which has been until recent years the vacation residence for the French president. Since 2007, La Lanterne has also served as a retreat for the French president, on the grounds of its seclusion and its relative anonymity, thus providing a level of security that is difficult to maintain at the Grand Trianon due to the hordes of tourists visiting the building and gardens.

The estate is adjacent to the Park of Versailles and situated on the road that links Versailles with Saint-Cyr-l'École. The estate includes a central two-story U-shaped building with a central section measuring 20 meters long by 6 meters wide. The central section is flanked by two parallel wings—of a later date and lower than the central section—which frame a gravel courtyard. A tree-lined lane links the courtyard with the Saint-Cyr road. The estate also includes a swimming pool, a tennis court, and five guest rooms.

The Pavillon de la Lanterne, located on the border of the Ménagerie, was built in 1787 by Philippe Louis Marc Antoine de Noailles, prince de Poix, who was the captain of the hunt and governor of Versailles, and was offered to his father, the comte de Noailles, by Louis XV. Then it included a ground floor as well as an attic floor. The façades were ornamented with seven stucco decorated spans—six windows and one central door, which was surmounted by a pediment. Owing to the lack of archival information, the architect of this building is unknown.

Between 1785 and 1786, the 36 herms of the grille that separated the courtyard—and especially the two herms surmounted by deer heads—were restored. As with other buildings at Versailles, La Lanterne was given up during the Revolution. In 1818, Louis XVIII repurchased the estate. Between 1942 and 1943 the deer-headed herms of the entry grill were restored; and in 1994, a full restoration of the pavilion was executed.

In 1959, President Charles de Gaulle designated the former hunting lodge reserved for the use of serving prime ministers. However, André Malraux, then Minister of Culture stayed there between 1962 and 1969 after his apartment in Boulogne-Billancourt was destroyed by an assassination attempt by the Organisation armée secrète. Most of the pavillon's decoration, which was decided by Louise Levêque de Vilmorin (4 April 1902 – 26 December 1969), former fiancée of Antoine de Saint-Exupéry and later companion of André Malraux, dates from this period. Michel Rocard, prime minister 1988–1991, ordered renovations and the construction of the swimming pool and the tennis court.

In 2007, shortly after his election as president, Nicolas Sarkozy spent his first week-end there (12–13 May) as president-elect. Officially, Sarkozy was invited by the prime minister, who, at the time, was Dominique de Villepin, thus making the Pavillon de la Lanterne an official residence of the president of the French Republic

Notes

Bibliography and sources
With regard to source materials for theses structures, the following list of imprints and articles has been used for this article:

External links
 Page discussing the Ménagerie and la Lanterne
 Satellite photo of La Lanterne
 La Lanterne on Google Maps

Palace of Versailles